Rick Wade is a South Carolina businessman and politician.

Personal life and education
Wade holds a bachelor's degree in biology from the University of South Carolina, as well as an MPA from Harvard University.

Career
Wade worked as an analyst for the South Carolina House Ways and Means Committee, as well as for the University of South Carolina. Wade served as the chief of staff of Lieutenant Governor Nick Theodore. Wade then served in the administration of Governor Jim Hodges as director of the South Carolina Department of Alcohol and Other Drug Abuse Services. In 2002, Wade ran for the office of Secretary of State, losing to Republican Mark Hammond.

Wade served as an adviser to both of Barack Obama's presidential campaigns. Wade also served in the Obama Administration as a senior adviser to Secretary of Commerce Gary Locke. Wade's duties included serving as a liaison to states, businesses, trade associations, minority communities, and other federal agencies. He also represented the Commerce Department at international forums and served on numerous presidential task forces. Wade's duties also included encouraging US businesses to invest in Haiti following the 2010 Haitian earthquake.

Wade is currently a self-employed consultant and a senior vice president with Greentech Automotive. Wade has also been an executive with Hoffmann-La Roche, Fowler Communications, and Palmetto GBA.

In December 2013, Wade announced his candidacy for the US Senate seat held by Republican incumbent Tim Scott in the 2014 election. Wade announced in March 2014 that he was dropping out of the race. Richland County Councilwoman Joyce Dickerson remained in the race, eventually becoming the Democratic Nominee.

References

External links
Facebook page

Living people
South Carolina Democrats
State cabinet secretaries of South Carolina
People from Lancaster, South Carolina
Harvard Kennedy School alumni
University of South Carolina alumni
Year of birth missing (living people)